is the 61st single of the Japanese group Morning Musume. It is the last single to feature 9th Generation member, Kanon Suzuki. It was released on May 11, 2016.

Background 
This triple A-Side single was announced on March 12 during the first night of "Morning Musume '16 Concert Tour Haru ~EMOTION IN MOTION~. Although no titles were announced, "Tokyo to Iu Katasumi" was performed on the same night of the announcement. Two days later, the titles were announced via their Official website citing the temporary title as "Tokyo to Iu Katasumi / The Vision / Utakata Saturday Night! (Temporary) (Order undecided)".

On April 6, the official order of songs was announced. The first and last title was switched, with no changes on all three titles. Their producer, Tsunku, also posted his comments regarding the latter two songs. He revealed that he wrote "The Vision" about people having a vision of a beautiful future. Subsequently, "The Vision" was performed for the first time on that same weekend.

Release details
The single was released in six versions: 3 CD-only regular editions and 3 CD+DVD limited editions. The first press regular editions come with a random trading card of 13 kinds depending on the jacket, which is 39 in total. The limited editions instead include an event lottery serial number card.

Members at time of single 
 9th generation: Mizuki Fukumura, Erina Ikuta, Kanon Suzuki 
 10th generation: Haruna Iikubo, Ayumi Ishida, Masaki Sato, Haruka Kudo
 11th generation: Sakura Oda
 12th generation: Haruna Ogata, Miki Nonaka, Maria Makino, Akane Haga

Track listing

References

2016 singles
Zetima Records singles
Japanese-language songs
Morning Musume songs
Electronic dance music songs
Electropop ballads
2010s ballads
Songs about Tokyo
Songs about nights